Any Love may refer to:

 Any Love (album), a 1988 album by Luther Vandross
 "Any Love" (Luther Vandross song), 1988 
 "Any Love" (Misia song), 2007